Petro Ivanovych Franko (21 June 1890 – 28 June 1941) was a Ukrainian educator, pedagogue, writer, ethnographer, scientist, military leader, and politician. Franko was a co-founder of the Plast, a Ukrainian Scouting Organization, and a former member of the Shevchenko Scientific Society.

Early life and education
Franko was born to Ukrainian writer Ivan Franko in Nahuievychi of Drohobych powiat (Kingdom of Galicia and Lodomeria) on 21 June 1890.

He graduated from the Lviv Polytechnic Institute.

He completed training as a pilot in 1916 at the flight school in Railovac, near Sarajevo.

Career 
Until World War I Franko was a teacher in a Ukrainian gymnasium in Lemberg. During that time he published a book, Plast's games (Пластові ігри та забави).

From 1914 Franko served as a poruchik (Lieutenant) in the Ukrainian Sich Riflemen where commanded a company (sotnia). In 1918 he organized an aviation school of the Ukrainian Galician Army Command Center, which was active until 1920.

He later worked as a teacher in Kolomyia (Second Polish Republic). From 1931 to 1936 he worked as a chemical engineer in the scientific-research institute in Kharkiv (Soviet Union). During that time, he became an author of 36 patented inventions. Before World War II, he lectured at the Lwow trade-economic institute, as well as in the city of Jaworow (again in Poland). In 1940, he was elected as a deputy to the Ukrainian Soviet Socialist Republic's Verkhovna Rada.

With the start of Operation Barbarossa (part of World War II) in June 1941, he was detained by Soviet authorities and transported out of Lviv.

Works
He was the author of several books, including the historical novellas Makhnivska Popivna (Махнівська попівна), In ancient woods of Brazil (В пралісах Бразилії), memoirs Ivan Franko from up close (Іван Франко зблизька), a movie script of Boryslav Laughs (Борислав сміється) and others.

Death and legacy 

Franko died under unknown circumstances. Some sources claim that he died on 28 June 1941 during his attempt to escape at the Proshov railway station near Ternopil while being transported by train. Another sources claim that he was killed by NKVD operatives in the summer months of the same year.

A mural to Franko was unveiled in Aviakonstruktora Antonova Street in Kyiv.

In 2011, the Lviv regional council posthumously awarded Franko with the "90th anniversary of the proclamation of the Western Ukrainian People's Republic" award.

In the city of Starokonstantyniv, at the entrance to the 7th Aviation Brigade on Myr Street, a portrait of Petro Franko, whose name the military unit bears, was painted on a concrete slab.

On August 24, 2020, on the Independence Day of Ukraine, a mural dedicated to Petro Franko was unveiled in Kyiv's Solomianskyi district, on the facade of a building at 7 Aviakonstruktora Antonova Street.

On the occasion of the 130th anniversary of the birth of Petro Franko and the Day of the Defender of Ukraine, on October 14, 2020, the first monument to Petro Franko was unveiled on the square of the Ivan Franko Literary and Memorial Museum in Nahuyevychi.

Family 
Franko was married twice, the second time to culinary writer, Olga Franko.

He has two daughters, Vira and Ivanna, who live with their children in Kyiv.

References

External links
 

1890 births
1941 deaths
People from Lviv Oblast
People from the Kingdom of Galicia and Lodomeria
Ukrainian Austro-Hungarians
Scouting pioneers
Scouting and Guiding in Ukraine
Ukrainian writers
Ukrainian educators
Ukrainian ethnographers
Ukrainian chemists
Ukrainian politicians before 1991
Members of the Shevchenko Scientific Society
Ukrainian Galician Army people
Ukrainian people of World War I
Austro-Hungarian military personnel of World War I
Lviv Polytechnic alumni
First convocation members of the Verkhovna Rada of the Ukrainian Soviet Socialist Republic
Ukrainian people executed by the Soviet Union